Afro-Classic is an album by flautist Hubert Laws released on the CTI label featuring performances of popular and classical music by Laws recorded at Rudy Van Gelder's studio in 1970.

Reception
The AllMusic review by Thom Jurek awarded the album 5 stars stating "Afro-Classic is a classic for the manner in which Laws, with brilliant assistance from arranger Don Sebesky, melded the jazz and classical worlds — not to mention pop — into a seamless whole," aptly describing "[t]he liberties taken with the Passacaglia" as "revolutionary" rendering the "stunning" number "no longer simply a classical tune" but one which "begins to swing with Latin, blues, and jazz undertones. When Laws finally takes his solo, the tune simply grooves its way through to the end — with subtle sound effects that Brian Eno would be envious of because he hadn't thought of them yet."

Track listing
 "Fire and Rain" (James Taylor) - 7:58 
 "Allegro from Concerto No. 3 in D" (Johann Sebastian Bach) - 3:47 
 "Theme from Love Story" (Francis Lai) - 7:32 
 "Passacaglia in C Minor" (Johann Sebastian Bach) - 15:14 
 "Flute Sonata in F" (Wolfgang Amadeus Mozart) - 3:17

Personnel
Hubert Laws - flute  (on "Passacaglia", electric flute)
Bob James - electric piano
Gene Bertoncini - guitar
Ron Carter - bass (on "Passacaglia", electric cello solo)
Fred Waits  - drums 
Dave Friedman - vibraphone (on "Fire and Rain", vibes with fuzz pedal)
Richie "Pablo" Landrum, Airto Moreira - percussion
Fred Alston, Jr. - bassoon
Don Sebesky - arranger

References

1970 albums
CTI Records albums
Hubert Laws albums
Albums produced by Creed Taylor
Albums arranged by Don Sebesky
Albums recorded at Van Gelder Studio